David Arthur Eppstein (born 1963) is an American computer scientist and mathematician. He is a Distinguished Professor of computer science at the University of California, Irvine. He is known for his work in computational geometry, graph algorithms, and recreational mathematics. In 2011, he was named an ACM Fellow.

Biography
Born in Windsor, England, in 1963, Eppstein received a B.S. in Mathematics from Stanford University in 1984, and later an M.S. (1985) and Ph.D. (1989) in computer science from Columbia University, after which he took a postdoctoral position at Xerox's Palo Alto Research Center. He joined the UC Irvine faculty in 1990, and was co-chair of the Computer Science Department there from 2002 to 2005. In 2014, he was named a Chancellor's Professor. In October 2017, Eppstein was one of 396 members elected as fellows of the American Association for the Advancement of Science.

Eppstein is also an amateur digital photographer as well as a Wikipedia editor and administrator with over 190,000 edits.

Research interests
In computer science, Eppstein's research has included work on minimum spanning trees, shortest paths, dynamic graph data structures, graph coloring, graph drawing and geometric optimization. He has published also in application areas such as finite element meshing, which is used in engineering design, and in computational statistics, particularly in robust, multivariate, nonparametric statistics.

Eppstein served as the program chair for the theory track of the ACM Symposium on Computational Geometry in 2001, the program chair of the ACM-SIAM Symposium on Discrete Algorithms in 2002, and the co-chair for the International Symposium on Graph Drawing in 2009.

Selected publications

 Republished in

Books

See also
Eppstein's algorithm

References

External links

David Eppstein's profile at the University of California, Irvine

1963 births
Living people
American computer scientists
British emigrants to the United States
Cellular automatists
Columbia School of Engineering and Applied Science alumni
Fellows of the American Association for the Advancement of Science
Fellows of the Association for Computing Machinery
Graph drawing people
Graph theorists
Palo Alto High School alumni
People from Irvine, California
Recreational mathematicians
Stanford University School of Humanities and Sciences alumni
Researchers in geometric algorithms
University of California, Irvine faculty
Science bloggers
Scientists at PARC (company)
American Wikimedians